LaSondra Renee Barrett (born March 16, 1990) is an American ex-basketball forward who played one season for the Washington Mystics of the Women's National Basketball Association, as well as for overseas teams in Australia and Israel. She went to William B. Murrah High School and played collegiately for LSU. She is the cousin of former NFL quarterback Jason Campbell.

LSU statistics
Source

USA Basketball

Barrett was named to the USA Women's U19 team which represented the US in the 2009 U19 World's Championship, held in Bangkok, Thailand in July and August 2009. Although the USA team lost the opening game to Spain, they went on to win their next seven games to earn a rematch against Spain in the finals, and won the game 81–71 to earn the gold medal. Barrett scored 6.0 points per game.

WNBA
She was selected in the first round of the 2012 WNBA Draft (10th overall) by the Washington Mystics, and played for the team for one year.

References

External links
LSU Tigers bio

1990 births
Living people
American women's basketball players
Basketball players from Jackson, Mississippi
Forwards (basketball)
LSU Lady Tigers basketball players
McDonald's High School All-Americans
People from Flowood, Mississippi
Washington Mystics draft picks